Mount Jackling is a peak  south of Mount Frazier in the northern group of the Rockefeller Mountains on Edward VII Peninsula in Marie Byrd Land, Antarctica. It was discovered on January 27, 1929, by members of the Byrd Antarctic Expedition on an exploratory flight over this area. The name was applied by the United States Antarctic Service (1939–41) which explored the area.

References

Mountains of King Edward VII Land